The 2022–23 King Cup, or The Custodian of the Two Holy Mosques Cup, is the 48th edition of the King Cup since its establishment in 1957. The tournament began on December 20, 2022 and is scheduled to conclude with the final in May 2023. 

For the third year in a row, the tournament was limited to the 16 teams participating in the 2022–23 Saudi Professional League. This will be the first edition of the King Cup in which Al-Ahli, the most successful team in the competition, will not participate.

Al-Fayha are the defending champions after winning their first title last season. They were eliminated in the quarter-finals by Al-Ittihad.

Participating teams
A total of 16 teams participated in this season, all of which competed in the Pro League.

Bracket

Note:     H: Home team, A: Away team

Source: SAFF

Round of 16
The draw for the whole tournament was held on 1 November 2022. The dates for the Round of 16 fixtures were announced on 10 November 2022. All times are local, AST (UTC+3).

Quarter-finals
The dates for the Quarter-finals fixtures were announced on 5 January 2023. The Al-Wehda v Al-Batin was postponed for one day due to flight issues. All times are local, AST (UTC+3).

Semi-finals
All times are local, AST (UTC+3).

Top goalscorers
As of 14 March 2023:   

Bold players are still in the competition.

References

External links
Custodian of the Two Holy Mosques Cup – Saudi Arabia 2022, Goalzz.com
King's Cup, saff.com.sa

2022–23
2022–23 in Saudi Arabian football
Saudi Arabia
Saudi Arabia, Cup